Christ Episcopal Church is a historic Episcopal church in Springfield, Greene County, Missouri.  The church nave was built in 1870, and is a board-and-batten Gothic Revival style structure with a stone chancel added in 1927–1928.  A two-story, Collegiate Gothic style stone parish hall was added in 1927.

It was listed on the National Register of Historic Places in 1987.

References

Episcopal church buildings in Missouri
Gothic Revival church buildings in Missouri
Churches completed in 1870
Churches on the National Register of Historic Places in Missouri
Churches in Springfield, Missouri
19th-century Episcopal church buildings
National Register of Historic Places in Greene County, Missouri